Neftekhimik Nizhnekamsk may refer to:

HC Neftekhimik Nizhnekamsk, ice hockey club
FC Neftekhimik Nizhnekamsk, football club